Chah Bagh Hasan (also Romanized as Chāh Bāgh Ḩasan) is a village in Sharifabad Rural District, in the Central District of Sirjan County, Kerman Province, Iran. At the 2006 census, its population was 50, in 14 families.

References 

Populated places in Sirjan County